Warriors of Heaven and Earth is a 2003 Chinese action adventure film directed by He Ping. The film's notable cinematography captures a wide range of landscapes across China's Xinjiang province. It was China's official entry for the Academy Award for Best Foreign Language Film, though it did not get nominated.

Plot
The film is set in western China in 700AD during the Tang Dynasty, and revolves around two protagonists, the first of whom is Lieutenant Li of the Chinese army. Li's refusal to kill Göktürk women and child prisoners is classed as a mutiny, leading him to be expelled from the army and to become a fugitive, traveling through the Gobi Desert. Years later, he is saved by the survivors of a caravan which carries a powerful, mystical relic accompanied by a Buddhist monk. Li protects the caravan from Göktürks as well as the overlord of the region, Master An, who is hired by the Göktürk Khan to seize the relic.

The second protagonist, a Japanese emissary, Lai Xi, is ordered by the emperor of China to kill the fugitive, Li. In a twist of fate, Lai Xi discovers that the caravan is on a mission and helps Li to defend it, to ensure that it arrives at the capital safely. They promise to fight each other only after their duty is done, although that battle never comes to pass.

Cast

Awards and nominations
11th Beijing Student Film Festival
 Won: Best Visual Effect
 Won: Favorite Actress (Zhao Wei)
 Won: Favorite Actor (Jiang Wen)

27th Hundred Flowers Awards
 Nominated: Best Film
 Nominated: Best Actress (Zhao Wei)
 Nominated: Best Actor (Jiang Wen)
 Nominated: Best Actor (Wang Xueqi)

24th Golden Rooster Awards
 Nominated: Best Supporting Actor (Wang Xueqi)

Soundtrack

The original score was composed by Indian composer A. R. Rahman. Warriors of Heaven and Earth: Original Motion Picture Soundtrack was released on CD featuring 14 tracks, which include excerpts from the score and 1 theme song, "Warriors in Peace", sung by Taiwanese singer Jolin Tsai. Following the film's release, the score and soundtrack were released in one album separately, under the title Between Heaven and Earth. The album also include the theme song, "Warriors in Peace", in two languages, which are the Hindi version by Sadhana Sargam and English version by Sunitha Sarathy.

Rahman signed the project after the head of Sony Classical Music suggested he do project for them in the Western Classical mode. While signing the project, Rahman was working with violinist Joshua Bell on compositions based on poems by the Persian poet Rumi. This project was later cancelled. Originally the music was supposed to be recorded in Beijing. But because of SARS, Rahman moved to Prague to record the score.

Rahman has mixed Chinese, Turkish and Indian sounds as the film is about the Silk Route. He says that he wanted to give the Chinese something they had not heard before, while retaining that international flavour. The score is completely acoustic with symphonic pieces and relatively little electronic sounds have been used. Performers of the score include The Czech Film Orchestra and Chinese soloists in Hong Kong. Other instruments, including the erhu, flute, duduk, dizi, taiko drums are featured.

 Track listing

See also
List of historical drama films of Asia

References

External links

Warriors of Heaven and Earth at Vista Records

2003 films
Chinese epic films
2000s Mandarin-language films
Wuxia films
Sony Pictures Classics films
Films set in 7th-century Tang dynasty
Films directed by He Ping
Films scored by A. R. Rahman
Chinese action adventure films
2000s action adventure films